Kamel Hmeisheh (born 1 January 1998) is a Syrian footballer who plays as a midfielder for Iraqi club Al-Karkh and the Syria national team.

Club career

Tishreen 
On 26 June 2018, Tishreen renewed Hmeisheh's contract. On 29 January 2020, Hmeisheh suffered a sprained ankle and was on the sidelines for three weeks. After helping Tishreen win the league title in 2019–20, Hmeishe's contract was renewed for a further season on 6 September 2020.

Al-Karkh 
In January 2022, Hmeisheh joined Iraqi Premier League side Al-Kharkh.

International career 
Hmeisheh represented Syria internationally at under-23 level, playing at the 2020 AFC U-23 Championship. He was first called up to the senior team on 5 September 2019, making his debut in a 2022 FIFA World Cup qualification match against the Philippines.

Honours 
Tishreen
 Syrian Premier League: 2019–20, 2020–21

References

External links
 
 
 
 

1998 births
Living people
People from Latakia
Syrian footballers
Association football midfielders
Tishreen SC players
Al-Karkh SC players
Syrian Premier League players
Iraqi Premier League players
Syria youth international footballers
Syria international footballers
Syrian expatriate footballers
Syrian expatriate sportspeople in Iraq
Expatriate footballers in Iraq